Great Central or Great Central Railway may refer to:

Railways
 Great Central Railway, a historical railway company in the United Kingdom
 Great Central Railway (heritage railway), a modern heritage railway in Leicestershire, England
 Great Central Railway (Nottingham), a modern heritage railway in Nottinghamshire, England
 Great Central Main Line, the historical route these companies follow(ed)
 Great Lakes Central Railroad, a short line in Michigan, United States
 Great Western and Great Central Joint Railway, a main line in south east England
 Hull and Barnsley and Great Central Joint Railway, also known as the Gowdall and Braithwell Railway
 Great Central tube station, the former name of Marylebone London Underground station, in England

Other
 Great Central Lake, lake in British Columbia, Canada
 Great Central League, baseball league in the Upper Midwest United States
 Great Central Mines, a defunct mining company in Australian
 Great Central Road, in Australia

See also
 Grand Central (disambiguation)